Nykyrka Church is a church building in the outer parts of western Mullsjö in Sweden. Belonging to the Mullsjö-Sandhem Parish of the Church of Sweden, it was opened in October 1887 replacing a 1656 church.

References

External links

19th-century Church of Sweden church buildings
Churches in Mullsjö Municipality
Churches completed in 1887
Mullsjö
Churches in the Diocese of Skara